Events from the year 1769 in art.

Events
 April 25–May 27 – First Royal Academy summer exhibition held in London.

Awards
 Joshua Reynolds is knighted.

Works

 Charles Catton – Self-portrait
 Joseph Ducreux – Marie Antoinette (portrait miniature)
 Jean-Honoré Fragonard
 Inspiration (Self-portrait, Louvre, Paris)
 Self-portrait with palette and brushes (approximate date; Fragonard Museum, Hélène & Jean-François Costa Collection, Grasse)
 Christopher Hewetson – Busts of Charles Townley and Sir Watkin Williams-Wynn
 Ozias Humphry – Charlotte, Princess Royal (portrait miniature, Windsor Castle)
 Alexander Roslin – John Jennings Esq., his Brother and Sister-in-Law
 Jean-Pierre-Antoine Tassaert – Love Triumphant (L'Amour prêt à lancer un trait, marble, approximate date)
 Johann Zoffany – The Drummond Family

Births
 January 8 – Pietro Benvenuti, Italian neoclassical painter (died 1844)
 January 31 – Henry Howard, English portrait and history painter (died 1847)
 March 4 – Ellen Sharples, English painter who specialized in portraits and watercolor miniatures (died 1849)
 March 9 – Adélaïde Binart, French neoclassical painter (died 1832)
 March 19 – Jacques François Joseph Swebach-Desfontaines, French painter and draughtsman (died 1823)
 April 3 – Josiah Wedgwood II, English pottery owner, son of Josiah Wedgwood (died 1843)
 April 13 – Sir Thomas Lawrence, English portrait painter (died 1830)
 April 23 – Cornelia Scheffer, Dutch painter and portrait miniaturist (died 1839)
 June 26 – Robert Hills, English painter and etcher (died 1844)
 September 11 – Johann Erdmann Hummel, German painter (died 1852)
 September 19 – George Raper, English naval officer and nature artist (died 1797)
 October 18 – Jacques-Luc Barbier-Walbonne, French historical and portrait painter (died 1860)
 October 23 – James Ward, English painter, primarily of animals, and engraver (died 1859)
 December 9 – Adèle Romany, French painter (died 1846)
 December 23 – Sir Martin Archer Shee, British portrait painter (died 1850)
 December 29 – Robert Havell, Sr., English engraver and publisher (died 1832)
 date unknown
 Thomas Barker, British painter of landscape and rural life (died 1847)
 Pierre Charles Cior, French painter of historical subjects, portraits and miniatures (died c. 1838)
 William Cuming, Irish portrait painter (died 1852)
 Bartolomé Montalvo, Spanish painter specializing in landscapes, hunted animals and still lifes (died 1846)
 François Mulard, French neoclassical painter (died 1850)
 Karl Postl, Austrian painter (died 1818)
 Sin Wi, Korean painter in the literary artist's style of the late Joseon period (died 1847)
 Toyokuni, Japanese master of ukiyo-e, especially Kabuki actor prints (died 1825)

Deaths
 March 22 - Jean-Charles François, French engraver (born 1717)
 May 11 - Francesco Carlo Rusca, Italian painter (born 1701)
 May 31 - Francesco Fontebasso, Italian painter of the late-Baroque or Rococo period of Venice (born 1707)
 June 24 – Jan Palthe, Dutch portrait painter (born 1717)
 August 17 – Giuseppe Bazzani, Italian painter of the Rococo (born 1690)
 October 13 – Vito D'Anna, Italian painter, one of the most important artists of Sicily (born 1718)
 November 4 – Andreas Brünniche, Danish portrait painter (born 1704)
 November 5 – Prince Hoare, English sculptor (born 1711)
 December 15 – Pierre-Antoine Baudouin, French miniature painter and engraver (born 1723)
 date unknown
 Jacques-François Amand, French historical painter (born 1730)
 Giuseppe Grisoni, painter and sculptor (born 1699)
 Alexis Peyrotte, French decorator painter (born 1699)
 Sim Sajeong, Korean genre works painter in the style of the Joseon period (born 1707)
 probable – Hakuin Ekaku, Japanese Zen master, noted for his painting and calligraphy (born 1685)

 
Years of the 18th century in art
1760s in art